St Benedict's Church is a redundant Anglican church in the village of Paddlesworth, Kent, England. It is recorded in the National Heritage List for England as a designated Grade II* listed building, and is under the care of the Churches Conservation Trust.

History

The church dates from the early part of the 12th century, and was modified during the following century.  It closed as a church in 1678, and was then used for some 250 years for non-religious purposes. It is located by a farm, and was used as a farm building.  The church was restored in the early 20th century, and again later in the century.

Architecture

St Benedict's is constructed in ragstone rubble, and has a tiled roof.  Its plan is simple, consisting of two cells, a nave and a chancel.  The windows and doors are round-headed.  The interior is plain, and it contains a gallery added in the 19th century.  Also in the nave is a cast iron candelabrum dating from the late 17th century.

See also
List of churches preserved by the Churches Conservation Trust in Southeast England
List of places of worship in Tonbridge and Malling

References

External links
Photographs of the exterior and interior

Grade II* listed churches in Kent
Church of England church buildings in Kent
English churches with Norman architecture
Churches preserved by the Churches Conservation Trust
Snodland